Ashtanga Namaskara, Ashtanga Dandavat Pranam (अष्टाङ्ग दण्डवत् प्रणाम्), Eight Limbed pose, Caterpillar pose, or Chest, Knees and Chin pose is a asana sometimes used in the Surya Namaskar sequence in modern yoga as exercise, where the body is balanced on eight points of contact with the floor: feet, knees, chest, chin and hands.

Etymology and origins

The name comes from the Sanskrit words अष्ट asht, eight, अङ्ग anga, limb, and नमस्कार namaskar, bowing or greeting.

The asana is unknown in medieval hatha yoga. It forms part of Pant Pratinidhi's 1929 Surya Namaskar exercise sequence, not then considered to be yoga. The yoga researcher Mark Singleton argues that the postures forming the sequence of Surya Namaskar derive from the Indian gymnastic exercises called dands (dand meaning a stick or staff). He notes that in the Bombay Physical Education syllabus of 1940, Surya Namaskar is named Ashtang Dand, he supposes from this central posture, Ashtanga Namaskara. Singleton suggests further that this also gave its name to Krishnamacharya's and later his pupil K. Pattabhi Jois's system of Ashtanga Yoga, rather than supposing that the name of the system somehow came from the 2,000 year old Ashtanga, the Eight Limbs of Patanjali's system of yoga.

Description

Ashtanga Namaskara is a prone posture with eight parts of the body in contact with the ground: both feet, both knees, both hands, the chest, and either the chin or the forehead. The hands are below the shoulders, the elbows bent.

The pose has been used as an alternative to Chaturanga Dandasana in the Surya Namaskar sequence, considered suitable for practitioners lacking the strength to do the usual pose; arguments against this usage include compression of the lower back and stress on the shoulder joint. It was used in the early Surya Namaskar of Pant Pratinidhi, with the forehead touching the ground.

References

Sources

 
 
 
 

Reclining asanas
Surya Namaskar